Yevhen Yuriyovych Sonin (born 16 June 1974) is a former Ukrainian football player. In 2014, he managed an amateur club FC Dnipropetrovsk.

External links
 
 

1974 births
Living people
Footballers from Dnipro
Ukrainian footballers
Association football forwards
Ukrainian expatriate footballers
Expatriate footballers in Belarus
Expatriate footballers in Russia
Expatriate footballers in Kazakhstan
Russian Premier League players
Ukrainian Premier League players
FC APK Morozovsk players
FC Lida players
PFC Krylia Sovetov Samara players
FC Shakhtar Pavlohrad players
FC Metalurh Novomoskovsk players
MFC Mykolaiv players
FC Kryvbas Kryvyi Rih players
FC Dnipro players
FC Dnipro-2 Dnipropetrovsk players
FC Torpedo Zaporizhzhia players
FC Zhemchuzhina Sochi players
FC Kristall Smolensk players
FC Hirnyk Kryvyi Rih players
FC Ordabasy players
FC Dynamo Makhachkala players